Ritva Koivula (born 18 January 1933) is a Finnish former freestyle swimmer. She competed in two events at the 1952 Summer Olympics.

References

External links
 

1933 births
Living people
Finnish female freestyle swimmers
Olympic swimmers of Finland
Swimmers at the 1952 Summer Olympics
Sportspeople from Vyborg